Laccaria amethysteo-occidentalis is a mushroom found under conifers, usually pine, growing alone, scattered or gregariously in western North America.

Description
The cap is 1–7 cm; broadly convex to plane, becoming nearly flat with age; often with a central depression. The surface is nearly bald, or fibrillose to scaly. Cap is hygrophanous, dark purple, purple, fading to brownish purple or buff.

The gills are attached to the stem, sub-distant to distant, purple fading to dull lilac or grayish purple. The stem is 1.5–12 cm long and 0.5–1.5 cm thick, equal or slightly swollen at the base and strongly grooved, with striated, coarse hairy or scaly purplish to pale purple color. The flesh is thin purple to whitish. The mushroom is edible.

Spores are 7.5–10.5 x 7–16 µm, subglobose or broadly elliptical. The spore print is white.

Similar species
This species is similar to  L. amethystina but differs by occurring than hard wood forest and in Eastern North America, rather than conifers forest; having a smaller sporocarp; and being a lighter purple color. L. bicolor is smaller and less purplish; L. laccata has whitish mycelium at its base. Cortinarius violaceus is darker and has a less fibrillose stipe.

References

Further reading
 (Archived at: CYBERLIBER: an Electronic Library for Mycology.)

External links

Edible fungi
amethysteo-occidentalis
Fungi of North America